The  is a skyscraper located in Minato, Tokyo, Japan. Construction of the 172-metre skyscraper was finished in 2003.

External links
  

Buildings and structures completed in 2003
Buildings and structures in Minato, Tokyo
Skyscrapers in Tokyo
Shiodome
Mitsubishi Estate